Enoch Arden Mounts (July 9, 1917 – March 4, 2003) was an American NASCAR Grand National Series driver from Gilbert, Mingo County, West Virginia. His primary vehicle was the #18 self-owned Pontiac machine; although he would occasionally drive a Hudson vehicle on the race track.

Career
He raced in the NASCAR Grand National Series from 1953 to 1956. Like J.D. McDuffie, Alan Kulwicki, and Joe Nemechek, Mounts was an "independent" race car driver who would never receive manufacturer's support or the support of blockbuster sponsors.

Arden would earn six finishes in the top ten from the 37 races that he would compete in NASCAR. The 1954 Grand National season would see Mounts record his best championship finish at 21st place in the standings. Only the 1953 and 1956 NASCAR Cup Series seasons would see him finish better than he started in the races. Mounts would end up losing nearly one position on average from start to finish during his entire career.

His appearance at the 1955 Southern 500, where he would crash into Don Duckworth's stalled vehicle, would be captured on highlight films for generations. While Bill Champion managed to avoid Duckworth by swerving past the vehicle rapidly, Arden Mounts managed to see the stalled vehicle too late and crashed into him in a very hard manner. The proper usage of seat belts on the stock car automobiles would save the lives of both Mounts and Duckworth.

The types of racing tracks that best favored Arden was the dirt tracks where he finished an average of 18th place; intermediate tracks were very much a disadvantage to Mounts, where a finish of 42nd place was the career average for him.

Death
Mounts would die while being a patient at St. Mary's Hospital, a medical center in Huntington, West Virginia.

References

1917 births
2003 deaths
NASCAR drivers
People from Gilbert, West Virginia
Racing drivers from West Virginia